John Stewart Hobhouse, Baron Hobhouse of Woodborough, PC (31 January 1932 – 15 March 2004) was a British judge and law lord.

Hobhouse was born in Mossley Hill, Liverpool, the son of the shipowner Sir John Richard Hobhouse, and grandson of Henry Hobhouse, the MP. He was educated at Eton College. After working abroad in Australia and New Zealand on a sheep farm, Hobhouse returned to Christ Church, Oxford in 1951, where he read Jurisprudence. He was called to the bar by Inner Temple in 1955, of which he later became a bencher.

Following a pupillage with Michael Kerr, Hobhouse became a tenant at 7 King's Bench Walk, the chambers of Henry Brandon, and joined the Northern Circuit. At the bar he specialised in admiralty law. He was appointed a Queen's Counsel in 1973.

Hobhouse was made a High Court judge in 1982, receiving the customary knighthood, and was assigned to the Queen's Bench Division. He was made a Lord Justice of Appeal in 1993, when he was also sworn of the Privy Council. On 1 October 1998 he was appointed as a Lord of Appeal in Ordinary, becoming a life peer as Baron Hobhouse of Woodborough, of Woodborough in the County of Wiltshire.

Family
Lord Hobhouse was married to Susannah Roskill, the daughter of Sir Ashton Roskill QC. They had two sons and one daughter.

His grandfather Henry was the nephew and ward of Arthur Hobhouse, 1st Baron Hobhouse.

Notable cases

Notable judicial decisions in which Lord Hobhouse participated included:
 R (Factortame Ltd) v Secretary of State for Transport ("Factortame IV", Divisional Court)
 R v Hinks (House of Lords)
 Berezovsky v Michaels (House of Lords)
 Mirvahedy v Henley (House of Lords)
 Lange v Atkinson (Privy Council)
 B v Attorney General (Privy Council)
 Auckland Harbour Board v Commissioner of Inland Revenue (Privy Council)
 Dextra Bank & Trust Co Ltd v Bank of Jamaica (Privy Council)
 Shogun Finance Ltd v Hudson (House of Lords)
 Attorney General v Blake (House of Lords)
 Tomlinson v Congleton BC (House of Lords)
 Royal Bank of Scotland plc v Etridge (No 2) (House of Lords)
 Westdeutsche Landesbank Girozentrale v Islington LBC (at first instance)
 Hazell v Hammersmith and Fulham LBC (at first instance)
 Morgan Grenfell & Co Ltd v Welwyn Hatfield DC (Divisional Court - key test case in the local authorities swaps litigation)
 R v Bow Street Stipendiary Magistrate, ex parte United States Government (House of Lords)

References

1932 births
2004 deaths
Alumni of Christ Church, Oxford
Hobhouse of Woodborough
Hobhouse of Woodborough 
Members of the Inner Temple
Members of the Privy Council of the United Kingdom
People educated at Eton College
Queen's Bench Division judges
Members of the Judicial Committee of the Privy Council
Hobhouse of Woodborough
Knights Bachelor
John